Elisa Leonida Zamfirescu (10 November 1887 – 25 November 1973) was a Romanian engineer who was one of the first women to obtain a degree in engineering. She was born in the Romanian town of Galați but qualified in Berlin. During World War I she managed a hospital in Romania.

Early life and education
Elisa Zamfirescu was born in Galați, Romania, on 10 November 1887. Her father, Atanase Leonida, was a career officer while her mother, Matilda Gill, was the daughter of a French-born engineer. She was one of 11 children; among her siblings were Dimitrie Leonida, also an engineer, and Gheorghe Leonida, a sculptor. 

Due to prejudices against women in the sciences, Zamfirescu was rejected by the School of Bridges and Roads in Bucharest. In 1909 she was accepted at the Royal Academy of Technology Berlin, Charlottenburg. She graduated in 1912, with a degree in engineering. It has been claimed that Zamfirescu was the world's first female engineer, but Englishwoman Nina Cameron Graham also gained a degree in civil engineering in 1912, from the University of Liverpool and the Irish engineer Alice Perry graduated six years before either of them: in 1906.

Career
Returning to Romania, Zamfirescu worked as an assistant at the Geological Institute of Romania. During World War I, she joined the Red Cross and ran a hospital at   Mărășești Romania. In 1917 her hospital received the wounded from the Battle of Mărășești between the German and the Romanian armies. It was a victory by Romania over 28 days during which there were over 12,000 Romanian and over 10,000 of the invaders who were wounded.

Around this time, she met and married chemist Constantin Zamfirescu, brother of the politician and writer Duiliu Zamfirescu.

After the war, Zamfirescu returned to the Geological Institute. She led several geology laboratories and participated in various field studies, including some that identified new resources of coal, shale, natural gas, chromium, bauxite and copper. Zamfirescu also taught physics and chemistry.

Later life and death
Zamfirescu retired in 1963, aged 75. In retirement she was involved in activism for disarmament. She died at the age of 86 on 25 November 1973.

An award for women working in science and technology was established in her name, the Premiul Elisa Leonida-Zamfirescu.

Honours and awards
Zamfirescu was the first woman member of AGIR (General Association of Romanian Engineers). A street in Sector 1 of Bucharest bears her name, and she was honoured with a Google Doodle on the anniversary of her birthday in 2018.

References

External links

 "Elisa Leonida Zamfirescu" in Pioneers: Trailblazing women in the arts, sciences and society, 2019 exhibition by Europeana (CC By-SA) 

Technical University of Berlin alumni
Romanian civil engineers
20th-century Romanian engineers
Romanian women engineers
People from Galați
1887 births
1973 deaths
20th-century women engineers